Terri Lynn Hill (born May 3, 1959) is an American politician who serves as a Delegate to the Maryland General Assembly representing Maryland's 12th Legislative District, which encompasses portions of Baltimore and Howard Counties.

Personal life 
Hill was born on May 3, 1959 in Pennsylvania and attended high school at Wilde Lake Senior High School in Columbia, Maryland. She earned her undergraduate degree from Harvard University in bioelectric engineering before attending medical school at Columbia University.

Hill has received a number of awards, including the Archdiocese of Baltimore's Mother Mary Lange Leadership Award, the Distinguished Black Marylander Award from Towson University, and the Outstanding Professional Achievement Spirit Award from the Columbia Chapter of Alpha Kappa Alpha. She maintains involvement with a wide range of professional and civic organizations, including the American Medical Association, Medchi, the Columbia Democratic Club, and the Thurgood Marshall Democratic Club.

Medical career 
Following completion of medical school, Hill was a resident in plastic and reconstructive surgery at Columbia Presbyterian Medical Center and served a fellowship in craniofacial surgery at the University of Miami School of Medicine. Since 1991, she has maintained a practice in plastic surgery in Ellicott City, Maryland.

In October 2021, Hill was fined $15,000 and reprimanded for twice participating in legislative meetings via videoconference from an operating room during surgery.

Political career 
Following redistricting in 2010, the three incumbent legislators representing District 12, which had formerly been divided into two sub-districts, chose not to run for re-election. Hill ran for the seat in a crowded primary field, and was elected alongside Eric Ebersole and Clarence K. Lam as an all-freshman delegation to the General Assembly.

In the Legislature
Upon being sworn in, Hill was appointed to the Health and Government Operations Committee, where she has served on a number of subcommittees, including the Insurance Subcommittee and the Health Facilities and Pharmaceuticals Subcommittee. She has served on the Death with Dignity Workgroup since 2015 and is a member of both the Legislative Black Caucus of Maryland and the Women Legislators of Maryland.

2020 7th congressional district special election 
Hill was an unsuccessful candidate in the 2020 Maryland 7th congressional district special primary election to fill out the term of the late Elijah Cummings. Following the primary loss, she withdrew her candidacy in the overlapping regular 2020 primary election for the same congressional seat.

References 

1959 births
Living people
Democratic Party members of the Maryland House of Delegates
21st-century American politicians
Harvard University alumni
Columbia University Vagelos College of Physicians and Surgeons alumni
21st-century American women politicians
Candidates in the 2020 United States elections
Women state legislators in Maryland
African-American state legislators in Maryland
African-American women in politics
21st-century African-American women
21st-century African-American politicians
20th-century African-American people
20th-century African-American women